Separatrix (from Latin, the feminine form of "separator") may refer to:

Separatrix (decimal mark), an  mark or vertical bar  formerly used as a decimal point
Separatrix, a proofreader's mark resembling the slash 
Separatrix in math, the boundary separating two modes of behaviour in a differential equation
A mechanism for magnetically limiting a plasma, and hence for controlling the nuclear fusion in a tokamak; see divertor

See also
 Separator (disambiguation)